The 2019 Alabama Crimson Tide baseball team represented the University of Alabama in the 2019 NCAA Division I baseball season. The Crimson Tide played their home games at Sewell–Thomas Stadium. This season is the second under head coach Brad Bohannon.

Preseason

SEC media poll
The SEC media poll was released on February 7, 2019 with the Crimson Tide predicted to finish in last place in the Western Division.

Personnel

Returning starters

Roster

Coaching staff

Schedule

! style="" | Regular Season
|- valign="top" 

|- bgcolor="#ddffdd"
| February 15 ||  ||  || Tuscaloosa, AL || 7–2 || S. Finnerty (1–0) || A. Durden (0–1) || None || 3,366 || 1–0||–
|- bgcolor="#ffdddd"
| February 16 || Presbyterian ||  || Sewell–Thomas Stadium || 1–4 || J. Rice (1–0) || D. Medders (0–1) || C. Springs (1) || –|| 1–1||–
|- bgcolor="#ddffdd"
| February 16 || Presbyterian  ||  || Sewell–Thomas Stadium || 9–4 || C. Shamblin (1–0)|| R. Fowler (0–1)|| J. Randolph (1) || 4,455 || 2–1||–
|- bgcolor="#ddffdd"
| February 18 ||  || || Sewell–Thomas Stadium || 13–2 || K. Cameron (1–0) || A. London (0–1) || None|| 2,631|| 3–1||–
|- bgcolor="#bbbbbb"
| February 20 ||  || || Sewell–Thomas Stadium ||  colspan=7| Postponed (inclement weather)
|- bgcolor="#ddffdd"
| February 22 ||  || || Sewell–Thomas Stadium ||  7–1 || S. Finnerty (1–0) ||D. Jameson (0–1) || None || 2,523 || 4–1||–
|- bgcolor="#ffdddd"
| February 23 || Ball St. ||  || Sewell–Thomas Stadium || 5–8 || M. Pachmayer (1–0) || T. Ras (0–1)|| K. Nicolas (1) ||2,672 || 4–2 ||–
|- bgcolor="#ddffdd"
| February 24 || Ball St.|| || Sewell–Thomas Stadium || 6–0 || C. Shamblin (2–0)|| B. Burns (0–2) || None || 2,648 ||5–2||–
|- bgcolor="#ddffdd"
| February 26 ||  || || Sewell–Thomas Stadium || 8–0 ||W. Freeman (1–0) || A. Mancour (0–1)||None || 2,957|| 6–2||–
|- bgcolor="#ddffdd"
| February 27 || North Alabama || || Sewell–Thomas Stadium || 4–1 ||C. Lee (1–0) ||G. Gillum (0–1) || J. McNairy (1)|| 2,849|| 7–2||–
|-

|- bgcolor="#ddffdd"
| March 1|| at  || || Stanky FieldMobile, AL || 7–3 || S. Finnerty (3–0)|| N. DeSantis (0–1)|| C. Cobb (1) || 3,013 || 8–2||–
|- bgcolor="#ddffdd"
| March 2 || at South Alabama || ||Stanky Field||10–5 || D. Medders (1–1)|| J. Booker (0–2)|| None || –|| 9–2||–
|- bgcolor="#ddffdd"
| March 2 || at South Alabama || ||Stanky Field|| 6–1 ||B. Love (1–0) ||C. Yarborough (1–1) || None || 2,538 || 10–2||–
|- bgcolor="#ddffdd"
| March 5 || || ||  || 4–3 ||G. Rukes (1–0) || G. Ashcraft (1–1) || J. Randolph (2)|| 2,424 || 11–2 ||–
|- bgcolor="#ddffdd"
| March 6 ||  || ||Sewell–Thomas Stadium || 5–4(14) || K. Cameron (2–0)|| R. McSherry (0–1) || None || 2,377 || 12–2||–
|- bgcolor="#ddffdd"
| March 8 ||  || ||Sewell–Thomas Stadium ||15–1||S. Finnerty (4–0) ||S. Williams (0–4)||None||2,416||13–2||–
|- bgcolor="#ddffdd"
| March 9 || Northern Kentucky || ||Sewell–Thomas Stadium ||9–4||B. Love (2–0) ||K. Service (0–2)||None ||2,471||14–2||–
|- bgcolor="#ddffdd"
| March 10 || Northern Kentucky || ||Sewell–Thomas Stadium || 10–1 ||W. Freeman (1–0) ||K. Arganbright (0–1) ||None ||2,569 || 15–2||–
|- bgcolor="#ddffdd"
| March 12 ||  || #26 ||Sewell–Thomas Stadium ||2–0 || D. Vainer (1–0) || J. Young (1–4)|| J. Randolph (3) || 2,713|| 16–2||–
|- bgcolor="#ffdddd"
| March 15 || at #19 Ole Miss ||#26 || Swayze FieldOxford, MS  || 0–1 || W. Ethridge (4–0)  || S. Finnerty (4–1) || P. Caracci (3) || 8,507 || 16–3 || 0–1
|- bgcolor="#ddffdd"
| March 16 || at #19 Ole Miss  || #26||Swayze Field ||8–6 ||D. Medders (2–1) || D. Nikhazy (1–2) || J. Randolph (4) || 9,016 || 17–3 || 1–1
|- bgcolor="#ffdddd"
| March 17 || at #19 Ole Miss || #26||Swayze Field||2–12 || G. Hoglund (1–0)  || W. Freeman (2–1) || None || 8,667 || 17–4 || 1–2
|- bgcolor="#ddffdd"
| March 19 ||  || || Sewell–Thomas Stadium || 16–0 || T. Ras (1–1)|| J. Courtney (0–1) || None || 2,889 || 18–4 ||–
|- bgcolor="#ffdddd"
| March 22 ||#10 Arkansas || || Sewell–Thomas Stadium || 3–12 || I. Campbell (5–0)  || S. Finnerty (4–2) || None || 4,060 || 18–5 || 1–3
|- bgcolor="#ddffdd"
| March 23 ||#10 Arkansas || || Sewell–Thomas Stadium ||10–0||B. Love (3–0) ||C. Noland (0–1)||None ||4,317||19–5||2–3
|- bgcolor="#ffdddd"
| March 24 ||#10 Arkansas || ||Sewell–Thomas Stadium||2–10 || C. Scroggins (2–0)  || W. Freeman (2–2) || None || 3,687 || 19–6 || 2–4
|- bgcolor="#ddffdd"
| March 26 † || vs. #13 Auburn || || Riverwalk StadiumMontgomery, AL ||6–3||J. Randolph (1–0) ||K. Gray (1–2)||None ||7,896||20–6|| –
|- bgcolor="#ffdddd"
| March 29 || at #19 Florida || || McKethan StadiumGainesville, FL|| 1–3 || T. Mace (5–2)  || S. Finnerty (4–3) || None || 4,521 || 20–7 || 2–5
|- bgcolor="#ffdddd"
| March 30 || at #19 Florida || ||McKethan Stadium|| 3–12 || C. Scott (3–1)||B. Love (3–1) || None||5,156 || 20–8||2–6
|- bgcolor="#ffdddd"
| March 31 || at #19 Florida || ||McKethan Stadium|| 3–6 || H. Ruth (1–0)||T. Ras (1–2) || None||3,785 || 20–9||2–7
|-

|- bgcolor="#ffdddd"
|April 2 ||  || ||  || 4–8 || S. Goodwin (2–3) || C. Shamblin (2–1)|| None || 3,137 || 20–10 ||–
|- bgcolor="#ddffdd"
|April 5 || South Carolina|| || Sewell–Thomas Stadium || 9–0 ||S. Finnerty (5–3) ||D. Lloyd (2–3)||None|| – ||21–10||3–7
|- bgcolor="#ddffdd"
|April 5 || South Carolina || || Sewell–Thomas Stadium || 4–1||B. Love (4–1) ||R. Morgan (3–1)||J. Randolph (5) ||3,171||22–10||4–7
|- bgcolor="#ffdddd"
|April 6  || South Carolina || ||Sewell–Thomas Stadium|| 4–5(12) || B. Kerry (3–1) || D. Medders (2–2) || None || 3,146 || 22–11|| 4–8 
|- bgcolor="#ddffdd"
|April 9  ||at  || ||Griffin StadiumBirmingham, AL||21–2 || G. Rukes (2–0)|| H. Skinner (0–1) || None || 1,221 || 23–11||–
|- bgcolor="#ffdddd"
|April 12 || at #10 Mississippi St. || ||Dudy Noble FieldStarkville, MS|| 0–6 ||E. Small (4–0) ||S. Finnerty (5–4) || None||10,386 || 23–12||4–9
|- bgcolor="#ffdddd"
|April 13 ||at #10 Mississippi St. || || Dudy Noble Field || 1–9 ||P. Plumlee (2–2) ||B. Love (4–2) || None|| 11,112|| 23–13||4–10
|- bgcolor="#ffdddd"
|April 14 ||at #10 Mississippi St. || ||Dudy Noble Field || 3–13 ||C. Gordon (4–0) ||C. Cobb (0–1) ||None || 8,593|| 23–14||4–11
|- bgcolor="#ddffdd"
|April 16 ||at  || ||Regions FieldBirmingham, AL || 3–2 ||G. Rukes (3–0) || A. Pondick (1–1) || J. Randolph (6)|| 1,518 || 24–14 ||–
|- bgcolor="#ffdddd"
|April 19 || #6 Vanderbilt|| ||Sewell–Thomas Stadium ||4–7 ||D. Fellows (8–0) ||S. Finnerty (5–5) || T. Brown (8)||2,862 || 24–15||4–12
|- bgcolor="#ffdddd"
|April 20 || #6 Vanderbilt|| ||Sewell–Thomas Stadium || 5–13 ||K. Rocker (4–4) ||B. Love (4–4) || Z. King (2)|| 3,609 || 24–16||4–13
|- bgcolor="#ffdddd"
|April 21 || #6 Vanderbilt || ||Sewell–Thomas Stadium || 5–13 ||P. Raby (6–1) ||J. Randolph (1–1) || T. Brown (9)|| 3,006 || 24–17||4–14
|- bgcolor="#ddffdd"
|April 24  ||at  || ||Abbott FieldJacksonville, AL|| 6–3 ||K. Cameron (3–0) || C. Edwards (4–4) || J. Randolph (7)|| 2,033 || 25–17 ||–
|- bgcolor="#ddffdd"
|April 26 || #15 LSU || ||Sewell–Thomas Stadium|| 6–1 ||S. Finnerty (6–5) ||Z. Hess (2–3) || None||4,240 || 26–17||5–14
|- bgcolor="#ffdddd"
|April 27 ||#15 LSU || ||Sewell–Thomas Stadium || 2–5 ||E. Walker (4–3) ||B. Love (4–5) || D. Fontenot (5)|| 4,452 || 26–18||5–15
|- bgcolor="#ffdddd"
|April 28 ||#15 LSU || || Sewell–Thomas Stadium  || 4–5 ||L. Marceaux (3–2)||J. Randolph (1–2)|| D. Fontenot (6) ||3,633||26–19||5–16
|-

|- bgcolor="#ffdddd"
|May 3 ||at Auburn || || Plainsman ParkAuburn, AL || 1–5 || J. Owen (4–0) ||S. Finnerty (6–6) || None||3,982 || 26–20||5–18
|- bgcolor="#ddffdd"
|May 4 || at Auburn || ||Plainsman Park|| 7–6 || J. Randolph (1–2)|| C. Greenhill (1–2)|| D. Medders (1)||3,532 || 27–20||6–17
|- bgcolor="#ffdddd"
| May 5 || at Auburn || ||Plainsman Park || 7–17 || B. Horn (2–0) ||B. Guffey (0–1) || None||3,665 || 27–21||6–18
|- bgcolor="#ddffdd"
| May 8 || at  || || Riddle–Pace FieldTroy, AL|| 7–3 || C. Cobb (1–1)|| G. Stewart (2–2)|| J. Randolph (8)||3,210 || 28–21||–
|- bgcolor="#ffdddd"
| May 10 ||#21 Texas A&M|| ||   || 2–3 || J. Doxakis (6–3) ||D. Vainer (1–1) || K. Kalich (11)||2,671 || 28–22||6–19
|- bgcolor="#ddffdd"
| May 11 ||#21 Texas A&M  || || Sewell–Thomas Stadium || 2–1||B. Love (5–4) ||A. Lacy (7–4)||J. Randolph (9) ||3,317||29–22||7–19
|- bgcolor="#ffdddd"
| May 12 ||#21 Texas A&M  || || Sewell–Thomas Stadium|| 5–6 || C. Weber (4–0) ||S. Finnerty (6–7) || K. Kalich (12)||2,466 || 29–23||7–20
|- bgcolor="#ddffdd"
| May 14 ||  || || Sewell–Thomas Stadium || 4–2 || J. Randolph (3–2)|| C. Radcliff (2–2)|| None||2,820 || 30–23||–
|- bgcolor="#ffdddd"
| May 16 || at #9 Georgia ||  || Foley FieldAthens, GA || 4–9  || C. Wilcox (3–1)||T. Ras (1–3) || None||3,006 || 30–24||7–21
|- bgcolor="#ffdddd"
| May 17 || at #9 Georgia || || Foley Field ||2–12 ||T. Locey (10–1) ||B. Love (5–5) || None|| 3,093 || 30–25||7–22
|- bgcolor="#ffdddd"
| May 18 || at #9 Georgia || || Foley Field ||1–9 || E. Hancock (8–2) ||S. Finnerty (6–8) || None||3,010 || 30–26||7–23
|-

† Indicates the game does not count toward the 2019 Southeastern Conference standings.Rankings are based on the team's current  ranking in the Collegiate Baseball poll.

Records vs. conference opponents

2019 MLB draft

See also
 2019 Alabama Crimson Tide softball team

References

Alabama
Alabama Crimson Tide baseball seasons
Alabama Crimson Tide baseball